The 2014–15 McNeese State Cowboys basketball team represented McNeese State University during the 2014–15 NCAA Division I men's basketball season. The Cowboys were led by eighth year head coach Dave Simmons and played their home games at Burton Coliseum, with three home games at Sudduth Coliseum in the Lake Charles Civic Center complex. The Cowboys are members of the Southland Conference.

The Cowboys were picked to finish fifth (5th) in both the Southland Conference Coaches' Poll and the Sports Information Directors Poll.  The team finished with an overall record of 15–16 including a record of 1–1 in the 2015 Southland Conference Men's Basketball Tournament.  The conference record for the 2014–15 season was 8–10 and finished in seventh place.

Roster
ֶ

Schedule and Results
Source

|-
!colspan=9 style="background:#0000FF; color:#FFD700;"|Out of Conference

|-
!colspan=9 style="background:#0000FF; color:#FFD700;"|Conference Games

|-
!colspan=9 style="background:#0000FF; color:#FFD700;"| Southland tournament

See also
2014–15 McNeese State Cowgirls basketball team

References

McNeese Cowboys basketball seasons
McNeese State
McNeese State
McNeese State